The first lady of Peru (Spanish: Primera Dama del Perú) is the title held by the spouse or designated female family member of the president of Peru. The role usually fulfills functions of social work and accompanying the president. There have been a number of first ladies that have been foreign to Peru.

History 
The first pioneer of political leadership in Peru was María Delgado de Odría, wife of President Manuel A. Odría, who developed extensive social work throughout the country aimed at those who needed it most.

In September 1919, Julia Josefa Swayne y Mariátegui, wife of Augusto B. Leguía (who had assumed the presidency in July of that year), died in London, unable to accompany her husband during the eleven years that he ruled.

In 1956, President Manuel Prado Ugarteche asked the Roman Rota to annul his marriage to Enriqueta Garland Higginson, who had already been first lady, which led a group of Catholic society ladies to go out dressed in mourning through the streets of Lima. The president remarried the socialite Clorinda Málaga Bravo in 1958, and until then the position was assumed by his daughter, Rosa Prado Garland de Parks.

In 1963, Fernando Belaúnde Terry assumed the presidency of the Republic, but the position of first lady was assumed by his sister Lucila Belaúnde de Cruchaga and by her daughter Carolina Belaúnde on some occasions, since the president was divorced from Carola Aubry. However, in 1966, on the occasion of the visit of Charles de Gaulle, the position was assumed by Carmen Jaime Torres, wife of the president of the Senate, Ramiro Prialé, interpreting the Congress that since the president of the Executive lacked a wife, the position should be assumed. by the wife of the President of the Legislative Assembly.

One First Lady who dedicated a lot of effort to welfare work was Violeta Correa, the second wife of Belaúnde Terry, who developed a series of actions with well-known Peruvian women, being also the creator of the so-called "family kitchens."

Pilar Nores, Alan García's wife, created in the eighties the Foundation for the Children of Peru, an institution dedicated to children in need and that would later be presided over by future first ladies. Susana Higuchi, Alberto Fujimori's wife, took over this foundation until her separation from her husband. After that, her daughter Keiko Fujimori took office at the age of 19, becoming the youngest first lady in the Americas and in the world.

Eliane Karp, wife of President Alejandro Toledo, served as First Lady and president of the previously mentioned Foundation for the Children of Peru. In 2002 the Office of the First Lady was created, from which she would support charitable causes. This office was dissolved by the government of Alan García in August 2006. After Nores and García's divorce was made public,  his daughters, Carla and Josefina, became the ones who accompanied him to official events.

Corruption scandals 
Much like their husbands, a number of first ladies of Peru have been implicated with charges of corruption under their spouse's administration.

Eliane Karp Toledo 
Karp has been accused of money laundering. She testified under Congress in 2013.

Nadine Heredia Humala 
The wife of president Ollanta Humala was accused of multiple crimes, and was arrested one year following Humala's administration and sent to testify under oath.

List

See also
 Presidents of Peru

Notes

References

Peru